The Antigua least gecko (Sphaerodactylus elegantulus) is a gecko endemic to the island nation of Antigua and Barbuda in the Caribbean Lesser Antilles, where it is found on both main islands.

References

.

External links

Reptile Database: Sphaerodactylus elegantulus

elegantulus
Lizards of the Caribbean
Endemic fauna of Antigua and Barbuda
Reptiles of Antigua and Barbuda
Reptiles described in 1914
Taxa named by Thomas Barbour